Ivan Vladimirovich Kovalev (June 28, 1901 – May 28, 1993) was a Soviet military officer and statesman. Lieutenant general of the Technical Troops (1943). Deputy of the Supreme Soviet of the Soviet Union of the 2nd Convocation (1946–1950).

Biography
Born into a peasant family, until the age of 18, he worked in his father's household. In March 1919, he was drafted into the ranks of the Workers' and Peasants' Red Army.
1919–1921 – Scout of the 31st Turkestan Artillery Battalion, Red Army Soldier of the 3rd Battalion of the All–Russian Extraordinary Commission in Voronezh;
1921–1922 – Cadet of the Voronezh Military Railway School of Technicians;
1922–1923 – Reserve Agent, Assistant to the Station Chief of the 10th Railway Regiment, then a battalion of the Caucasian Army;
1923–1925 – Political Leader of a company in the 13th Voronezh Railway Battalion, then in the 7th Michurinsky Railway Regiment;
1925–1926 – Student of the Advanced Training Courses for Command Personnel in Leningrad;
1926–1930 – Platoon Commander, Commander and Political Leader of a company of the 7th Railway Regiment;
1930–1935 – Student at the Military Transport Academy of the Workers' and Peasants' Red Army;
1935–1936 – Senior Inspector of the People's Commissariat of Communication Routes of the Soviet Union;
1936–1937 – Head of the Control and Inspection Group at the Administration of the Moscow–Belarusian–Baltic, then South Ural Railways;
1937–1939 – Road Inspector for Traffic Safety on the Omsk Railway, then Head of the Western Railway Department;
1939–1941 – Head of the Central Military Department, member of the Board of the People's Commissariat of Communication Routes of the Soviet Union;
May–July 1941 – Deputy People's Commissar of State Control of the Soviet Union for Railway Transport;
8 July 1941–1944 – Head of the Office of Military Communications of the Workers' and Peasants' Red Army (from January 1943 – of the Central Office of Military Communications of the Workers' and Peasants' Red Army). Also, since 1942, he was a member of the Transport Committee under the State Defense Committee of the Soviet Union.
20 December 1944–1948 – People's Commissar (Minister) of Communication Routes of the Soviet Union. Participated in the work of the Potsdam Conference.
1948–1950 – Chief Adviser to the Central Committee of the Communist Party of China – the head of Soviet military specialists in China;
1950–1951 – Head of the Donetsk District of Railways;
1951–1957 – Deputy Minister of the Coal Industry of the Soviet Union;
1957–1960 – Senior Researcher of the Military Scientific Directorate of the General Staff of the Armed Forces of the Soviet Union;
1960–1969 – Senior Lecturer at the Military Academy of the General Staff;
1969–1985 – at the Institute of World Economy and International Relations of the Academy of Sciences of the Soviet Union: Senior Researcher, Head of Laboratory, Chief Researcher;
Since September 1985, he has been a pensioner of the Ministry of Defense of the Soviet Union. During these years, he was a consultant at the Center for Operational–Strategic Research of the General Staff of the Armed Forces of the Soviet Union.

He was buried in Moscow at the Troyekurovskoye Cemetery.

Remembrance
On January 19, 2018, the Ministry of Defense of the Russian Federation established the Lieutenant General Kovalev Medal.

Awards
3 Orders of Lenin (1939, March 3, 1942, February 21, 1945);
Order of the October Revolution;
3 Orders of the Red Banner (September 18, 1943, November 3, 1944, ...);
Order of Suvorov, 1st Class (July 29, 1945);
Order of Kutuzov, 1st Class (August 3, 1944);
Order of the Patriotic War, 1st Class (March 11, 1985);
Order of the Red Star;
Order of the Red Banner of Labour;
A number of medals of the Soviet Union.

Works
Ivan Kovalev. Soviet Railway Transport. 1917–1947 – Moscow: Publishing House and 1st Printing House of the All–Union Publishing and Printing Association of Railway Transport, 1947;
Ivan Kovalev. Railway Transport in the New Stalinist Five–Year Plan – Moscow: Publishing House and 1st Printing House of the All–Union Publishing and Printing Association of Railway Transport, 1947;
Ivan Kovalev. Transport in the Decisive Operations of the Great Patriotic War – Moscow: Knowledge, 1969;
Ivan Kovalev. Rail Transport in the Far East Campaign // Military History Journal – 1975 – No. 9 – Pages 50–54;
Willful Decisions... [Interview With Ivan Kovalev] // Military History Journal – 1988 – No. 12 – Pages 38–50.

References

Sources
State Power of the Soviet Union. The Highest Authorities and Management and Their Leaders. 1923–1991. Historical and Biographical Reference Book / Compiled by Vladimir Ivkin – Moscow, 1999 – ISBN 5-8243-0014-3
Answers to the Questions of Professor Georgy Kumanev on May 28, 1988
Georgy Kumanev. Stalin's People's Commissars Speak – Smolensk: Rusich, 2005 – 632 Pages With Illustrations – ISBN 5-8138-0660-1
Always at the Forefront. Ivan Kovalev Was the First Minister of Communication Routes of the Soviet Union
Leonid Troitsky. People's Commissar of the Fiery Years – Moscow, 2002 – 239 Pages

1901 births
1993 deaths
People from Voronezh Governorate
Members of the Supreme Soviet of the Russian Soviet Federative Socialist Republic, 1938–1947
Second convocation members of the Supreme Soviet of the Soviet Union
Recipients of the Order of Kutuzov, 1st class
Recipients of the Order of Lenin
Recipients of the Order of the Red Banner
Recipients of the Order of the Red Banner of Labour
Recipients of the Order of the Red Star
Recipients of the Order of Suvorov, 1st class
Soviet lieutenant generals
People of the Russian Civil War
Burials in Troyekurovskoye Cemetery